The tarpon is a species of a large, herring-like fish of the genus Megalops.

Tarpon may also refer to:
Tarpon, Virginia, a community in the United States
Grumman Tarpon or Grumman TBF Avenger, a torpedo bomber
HMS Tarpon (1917), a destroyer
HMS Tarpon (N17), a submarine launched in 1939
USS Tarpon (SS-14) or USS C-3, a C-class submarine
USS Tarpon (SS-175), a Porpoise-class submarine that served during World War II
Rambler Tarpon, a 1963 concept car from the American Motors Corporation (AMC)

See also
Atlantic tarpon, a subspecies of tarpon (Megalops atlanticus)
HMS Tarpon, a list of ships of the British Royal Navy
Indo-Pacific tarpon, a subspecies of tarpon (Megalops cyprinoides)
Tarpan
USS Tarpon, a list of United States Navy ships
Tarpon Springs, Florida
Tarpon River, a river in Florida
Lake Tarpon, a lake in Florida